O Ribeiro is a comarca in the Galician Province of Ourense. The overall population of this local region is 15,808 (2019).

Municipalities
A Arnoia, Avión, Beade, Carballeda de Avia, Castrelo de Miño, Cenlle, Cortegada, Leiro, Melón and Ribadavia.

See also 

 Ribeiro (DO)

References 

O Ribeiro